The Symphony No. 5 is a symphony for orchestra by the American composer Christopher Rouse.  The work was jointly commissioned by the Dallas Symphony Orchestra, the Nashville Symphony, and the Aspen Music Festival.  It was completed in Baltimore on February 15, 2015, and was first performed by the Dallas Symphony Orchestra under the direction of Jaap van Zweden at the Morton H. Meyerson Symphony Center on February 9, 2017.

Composition

Background
The symphony has a duration of roughly 25 minutes and is written in one continuous movement, mimicking the traditional four-movement symphonic form.  Rouse drew inspiration for the work from Ludwig van Beethoven's Fifth Symphony, about which he recalled in the score program notes:
The composition thus features a number of homages to the Beethoven symphony, including a paraphrase of the famous four-note motif that opens the first movement.  Rouse added, "The most extended reference is to the connective passage that links the third and fourth movements of the Beethoven: the mysterious passage for timpani over a long chord in the strings. My timpani part is identical to Beethoven's; once again, though, what goes on around it is different."  He concluded, "As is often the case in my music, the language ranges freely — but I hope in an integrated way — between a dissonant language and a more consonant one. There is no programmatic element to the work, though I do hope to transport the listener through a series of emotional states, from turbulence to serenity."

Instrumentation
The work is scored for a large orchestra consisting of three flutes (third doubling bass flute), three oboes, three clarinets, three bassoons, four horns, three trumpets, three trombones, tuba, timpani, percussion (three players), two harps, and strings.

Reception
Reviewing the world premiere performance, Scott Cantrell of The Dallas Morning News wrote, "Rarely does a brand-new piece of music really grab me and keep me completely engaged on first hearing. But the world premiere of Christopher Rouse's brilliant, exciting and at times hauntingly beautiful Fifth Symphony had that effect Friday night, at the Meyerson Symphony Center. Judging by the roaring ovation after the Dallas Symphony Orchestra performance, under music director Jaap van Zweden, lots of others were similarly affected."  Wayne Lee Gay of the Texas Classical Review also praised the work, remarking, "With this new addition to the list, [Rouse] can stake claim to the title of the leading American symphonist of our time."  He added:

Recordings
 Christopher Rouse: Symphony No. 5 (Naxos) – 2020 , Grammy Award for Best Contemporary Classical Composition 2020
 Nashville Symphony; Giancarlo Guerrero, conductor.

References

5
2015 compositions
Rouse 5
Music commissioned by the Dallas Symphony Orchestra
Music commissioned by the Nashville Symphony